VITT is an engineering college in Tirupati, India.

Vaishnavi Institute of Technology was established in 2007, under the management of the Vaishnavi Educational Society.

Facilities
 Medical facilities
 Hostel facilities for girls

Bus
Buses are provided by the college for students and faculty who are staying in Tirupati and Tiruchanoor from Tanapalli.

Library
VIT has been registered as a centre for Jawaharlal Nehru Knowledge Center (JKC).

References

Engineering colleges in Andhra Pradesh
Universities and colleges in Tirupati
Educational institutions established in 2007
2007 establishments in Andhra Pradesh